Ralph Everly Bushman (1903 – 1978), was an American actor. He appeared in 55 films between 1920 and 1943. In his early film career, he often was credited as Francis X. Bushman Jr.

The son of notable silent film star Francis X. Bushman and Josephine Fladung Duval, he was born in Baltimore, Maryland and died in Los Angeles, California at age 74.

He was a maternal uncle of Pat Conway, star of the television series Tombstone Territory (1957–1960). He and his wife Beatrice were married for 54 years at the time of his death.

Selected filmography 
Our Hospitality (1923)
 The Man Life Passed By (1923)
 Never Too Late (1925)
 The Pride of the Force (1925)
Brown of Harvard (1926)
Dangerous Traffic (1926)
 Eyes Right! (1926)
Midnight Faces (1926)
The Understanding Heart (1927)
Four Sons (1928)
The Sins of the Children (1930)
They Learned About Women (1930)
The Girl Said No (1930)
The Royal Bed (1930)
Way Out West (1930)
 The Cyclone Kid (1931)
The Galloping Ghost (film serial, 1931)
The Last Frontier (film serial, 1932)
 Human Targets (1932)
 Tangled Fortunes (1932)
The Three Musketeers (film serial, 1933)
Viva Villa! (1934)
 When Lightning Strikes (1934)
Caryl of the Mountains (1936)

References

External links

1903 births
1978 deaths
American male film actors
American male silent film actors
20th-century American male actors